Scott Hudson may refer to:

 Scott Hudson (computer scientist), professor at Carnegie Mellon University
 Scott Hudson (electrical engineer), astronomer and professor of electrical engineering